Permissiveness  may refer to:

 Permissiveness (biology)
 Permissive society